The Rowell House is a historic house in Wellfleet, Massachusetts.  A small 1.5-story Cape-style house, it was probably built c. 1713, and is one of the oldest houses in Wellfleet.  It has three bays, with a large chimney behind the leftmost bay. The house was owned early in the 19th century by the Rowell sisters. And then passed onto the next generation.

The house was listed on the National Register of Historic Places in 1988.

See also
National Register of Historic Places listings in Barnstable County, Massachusetts

References

Houses in Barnstable County, Massachusetts
Wellfleet, Massachusetts
National Register of Historic Places in Barnstable County, Massachusetts
Houses on the National Register of Historic Places in Barnstable County, Massachusetts